†Partula dolorosa was a species of air-breathing tropical land snail, a terrestrial pulmonate gastropod mollusk in the family Partulidae. This species was endemic to a highland on Raiatea, French Polynesia. It is now extinct.

Extinction
After the introduction of the carnivorous snail Euglandina rosea, partulid species began disappearing quickly which native in Raiatea. A few snails were found in 1992 and they had survived in captivity, like Partula labrusca which from same habitat. Unfortunately these snails are not successful in captivity and the species is now extinct.

References

Partula (gastropod)
Extinct gastropods
Taxonomy articles created by Polbot